Nippers was a children's book series for early readers established by Leila Berg and published by Macmillan Educational in the United Kingdom from 1968 to 1983. The series deliberately featured working-class characters and settings.

History
Berg, who contributed many titles to the series herself, explained her motivation in a letter to the Times Literary Supplement:

The series encountered opposition, "on the grounds that children were being given what they already knew and that the vocabulary of the stories was impoverished and limiting". Nevertherless, Nippers became firmly established. Little Nippers, a series for younger children, followed in 1972. In the early 1970s, Berg also recruited several Black authors to write for Nippers, including Beryl Gilroy and Petronella Breinburg. Other contributors included J. L. Carr, Charles Causley, Mary Cockett, Helen Cresswell, Joan Eadington, Nigel Gray, Trevor Griffiths, Geraldine Kaye, Janet McNeill, Helen Solomon and Jacqueline Wilson. 

According to its publisher estimates, Nippers and Little Nippers sold over two million copies. However, in 1983 Macmillan allowed the series to go out of print.

Books in the Nippers series
 Jill Bavin, Saturday Morning. 1971. Nippers - Orange ; Level 2. Illustrated by Mary Dinsdale. 
 Leila Berg, A Day Out. 1968. Nippers - Red ; Level 1. Illustrated by Ferelith Eccles Williams. 
 Leila Berg, Bouncing. 1971. Nippers - Red ; Level 1. Illustrated by Margaret Belsky. 
 Leila Berg, Finding a Key. 1968. Nippers - Red ; Level 1. Illustrated by Jenny Williams. 
 Leila Berg, Fish and Chips for Supper. 1968. Nippers - Red ; Level 1. Illustrated by Richard Rose. 
 Leila Berg, Grandad’s Clock. 1976. Nippers - Red ; Level 1. Illustrated by Joan Beales. 
 Leila Berg, Jimmy’s Story. 1968. Nippers - Orange ; Level 2. Illustrated by Richard Rose. 
 Leila Berg, Julie’s Story. 1970. Nippers - Orange ; Level 2. Illustrated by Richard Rose. 
 Leila Berg, Lesley’s Story. 1970. Nippers - Orange ; Level 2. Illustrated by Richard Rose. 
 Leila Berg, Letters. 1970. Nippers - Red ; Level 1. 
 Leila Berg, Paul’s Story. 1970. Nippers - Orange ; Level 2. Illustrated by Richard Rose. 
 Leila Berg, Plenty of Room. 1975. Nippers - Red ; Level 1. Illustrated by Joan Beales. 
 Leila Berg, Robert’s Story. 1970. Nippers - Orange ; Level 2. Illustrated by Richard Rose. 
 Leila Berg, Susan’s Story. 1970. Nippers - Orange ; Level 2. Illustrated by Richard Rose. 
 Leila Berg, The Jumble Sale. 1968. Nippers - Red ; Level 1. Illustrated by George Craig. 
 Leila Berg, Tracy’s Story. 1972. Nippers - Orange ; Level 2. Illustrated by Richard Rose.
 Marilyn Bloomfield, Rex Is Out!. 1975. Nippers - Yellow ; Level 3. Illustrated by Trevor Stubley.
 Petronella Breinburg, Tiger, Paleface, and Me. 1976. Nippers - Blue ; Level 5. Illustrated by Richard Rose.
 Jim Buckingham, The Pop Trolley. 1971. Nippers - Blue ; Level 5. Illustrated by Charles Front. 
 J. L. Carr, The Red Windcheater. 1970. Nippers - Blue ; Level 5. Illustrated by George Adamson. 
 Irma Chilton, The Lamb. 1973. Nippers - Blue ; level 5. Illustrated by Dorothy Clark. 
 Mary Cockett, An Armful of Sparrows. 1973. Nippers - Green ; Level 4. Illustrated by George Adamson.
 Mary Cockett, Frankie’s Country Day. 1979. Nippers - Green ; Level 4. Illustrated by Mary Dinsdale. 
 Mary Cockett, The Lost Money. 1968. Nippers - Blue ; Level 5. Illustrated by Mary Dinsdale. 
 Mary Cockett, The Marvellous Stick. 1972. Nippers - Green ; Level 4. Illustrated by Mary Dinsdale.
 Mary Cockett, The Wedding Tea. 1970. Nippers - Yellow ; Level 3. Illustrated by Mary Dinsdale. 
 Mary Cockett, Tufty. 1968. Illustrated by George Adamson. 
 Helen Cresswell, John’s First Fish. 1970. Nippers - Blue ; Level 5. Illustrated by Prudence Seward.
 Ronald Deadman, The Pretenders. 1972. Nippers - Green ; Level 4. 
 Joan Eadington, Come on! Get Up!. 1973. Nippers - Orange ; Level 2. Illustrated by Joan Beales. 
 Joan Eadington, Conkers. 1975. Illustrated by Trevor Stubley. 
 Joan Eadington, Fishing. 1975. Illustrated by Gerald Rose. 
 Joan Eadington, Kickerdonkey!. Nippers - Orange ; Level 2. 1974. Illustrated by Margaret Belsky. 
 Joan Eadington, The Big Dig. 1975. Nippers - Red ; Level 1. Illustrated by Ray Fishwick. 
 Joan Eadington, The Terrible Rattle. 1973. Nippers - Yellow ; Level 3. Illustrated by Richard Rose. 
 Joan Eadington, Thigh’s Team. 1971. Nippers - Green ; Level 4. Illustrated by Geraldine Spence. 
 Beryl Gilroy, A Visitor From Home. 1973. Nippers - Green ; Level 4. Illustrated by Shyam Varma. 
 Beryl Gilroy, Arthur Small. 1976. Nippers - Red ; Level 1. 
 Beryl Gilroy, Knock at Mrs. Herbs’. 1973. Nippers - Green ; Level 4. Illustrated by Shyam Varma. 
 Beryl Gilroy, New People at Number 24. 1973. Nippers - Green ; Level 4. Illustrated by Shyam Varma. 
 Beryl Gilroy, New Shoes. 1976. Nippers - Green ; Level 1. Illustrated by Ferelith Eccles-Williams. 
 Beryl Gilroy, No More Pets. 1975. Nippers - Yellow ; Level 3. Illustrated by Margaret Belsky. 
 Beryl Gilroy, Outings for Everyone. 1975. Nippers - Yellow ; Level 3. Illustrated by Prudence Seward. 
 Beryl Gilroy, Rice and Peas . 1975. Nippers - Red ; Level 1. Illustrated by Beryl Sanders. 
 Beryl Gilroy, The Paper Bag. 1973. Nippers - Yellow ; Level 3. Illustrated by Shyam Varma. 
 Beryl Gilroy, The Present. 1975. Nippers - Green; Level 4. Illustrated by Nicole Goodwin. 
 Trevor Griffiths, Tip’s Lot. 1972. Nippers - Blue ; Level 5. Illustrated by George Adamson. 
 Margaret Heseltine, Bri's Accident. 1973. Nippers - Blue ; Level 5. Illustrated by Prudence Seward. 
 Geraldine Kaye, Bonfire Night. 1968. Nippers - Blue ; Level 5. Illustrated by George Adamson. 
 Geraldine Kaye, Christmas is a Baby. 1975. Nippers - Yellow ; Level 3. Illustrated by Richard Butler. 
 Geraldine Kaye, Eight Days to Christmas. 1970. Nippers - Blue ; Level 5. Illustrated by Shirley Hughes. 
 Geraldine Kaye, Ginger. 1972. Nippers - Orange ; Level 2. Illustrated by Shirley Hughes. 
 Geraldine Kaye, In the Park. 1970. Nippers - Yellow ; Level 3.
 Geraldine Kaye, Pegs and Flowers. 1975. Nippers - Red ; Level 1. Illustrated by Richard Butler. 
 Geraldine Kaye, The Rainbow Shirt. 1970. Nippers - Yellow ; Level 3. Illustrated by Lynette Hemmant.
 Janet McNeill, Growlings. 1975. 
 Janet McNeill, It's Snowing Outside. 1968. Nippers - Yellow ; Level 3. Illustrated by Carol Barker. 
 Janet McNeill, Look Who’s Here. 1976. Nippers - Red ; level 1. Illustrated by Gerald Rose. 
 Janet McNeill, The Day Mum Came Home. 1976. Nippers - Red ; Level 1. Illustrated by Prudence Seward. 
 Janet McNeill, The Day They Lost Grandad. 1968. Nippers - Yellow ; Level 3. Illustrated by Julius. 
 Janet McNeill, The Family Upstairs. 1973. Nippers - Blue ; Level 5. Illustrated by Trevor Stubley. 
 Janet McNeill, The Nest Spotters. 1972. Nippers - Yellow ; Level 3. Illustrated by Geraldine Spence.
 Richard Parker, Lost in a Shop. 1968. Nippers - Orange ; Level 2. Illustrated by Carol Barker. 
 Richard Parker, Me and My Boots. 1971. Nippers - Blue; Level 5. Illustrated by George Adamson. 
 Barbara Paterson, The Boy in the Park. 1972. Nippers - Orange ; Level 2. Illustrated by Gareth Floyd. 
 Peter Pickering, Uncle Norman. 1968. Nippers - Green ; Level 4. Illustrated by Julius.
 Denise Robertson, The New Bath. 1970. Nippers - Green ; Level 4.
 Denise Robertson, The New Car. 1972. Nippers - Green; Level 4. Illustrated by John Dyke. 
 Denise Robertson, The New Pet. 1973. Nippers - Green; Level 4. Illustrated by John Dyke. 
 Rachel Scott, The School Trip. 1976. Nippers - Red; Level 1. Illustrated by Nicole Goodwin. 
 Christine Thompson, The Play. 1973. Nippers - Orange ; Level 2. Illustrated by Prudence Seward. 
 Nancy Tuft, Scruff’s New Home. 1970. Nippers - Green ; Level 4. Illustrated by Prudence Seward. 
 Jacqueline Wilson, Ricky’s Birthday. Nippers - Orange ; Level 2. Illustrated by Margaret Belsky.

Books in the Little Nippers series
 Leila Berg, The Doctor. 1972. Little Nippers Book 8. Illustrated by Biro. 
 Leila Berg, Doing the Pools. 1972. Little Nippers Book 2. Illustrated by Richard Rose. 
 Leila Berg, Hospital Day. 1972. Illustrated by Shirley Hughes. 
 Leila Berg, Knitting. 1972. Illustrated by George Him. 
 Leila Berg, My Brother. 1972. Illustrated by Linda Birch. Little Nippers Book 6. 
 Leila Berg, Put the Kettle On!. 1972. Illustrated by John Dyke. Little Nippers Book 4. 
 Leila Berg, That Baby!. 1972. Little Nippers Book 1. Illustrated by Margaret Belsky. 
 Leila Berg, Well I Never!. 1972. Little Nippers Book 3. Illustrated by George Him. 
 Leila Berg, A Band in School. 1975. Illustrated by John Dyke. 
 Charles Causley, When Dad Felt Bad. 1975. Illustrated by Richard Rose. 
 Beryl Gilroy, In Bed. 1975. Illustrated by Robert Hales. 
 Beryl Gilroy, Bubu's Street. 1975. Illustrated by George Him. 
 Beryl Gilroy, Once Upon A Time. 1975. Illustrated by Joan Beales. 
 Nigel Gray, My Cat. 1975. Illustrated by Terry Reid. 
 Helen Keenan, My Tooth. 1975. Illustrated by Richard Rose. 
 Janet McNeill, My Auntie. 1975. Illustrated by Janet McNeill. 
 Janet McNeill, Go On, Then. 1975. Illustrated by Terry Reid. 
 Helen Solomon, A Present from the Seaside. 1972. Nippers- Blue; Level 5. Illustrated by John Dyke. 
 Helen Solomon, Billy Finds a Pigeon. 1971. Nippers - Blue ; Level 5. Illustrated by John Dyke. 
 Helen Solomon, Dad’s Pie. 1976. Nippers - Red ; Level 1. 
 Helen Solomon, Gran’s Glasses. 1976. Nippers - Red ; Level 1. Illustrated by Richard Rose. 
 Helen Solomon, The Jazz Band. 1972. Nippers - Green; Level 4. Illustrated by Val Biro.

References

External links
 Nippers | Leila Berg, author & story-teller
 Little Nippers books written and edited by Leila Berg
 
Macmillan Publishers books
Series of children's books
1968 establishments in the United Kingdom
Book series introduced in 1968